Justino Monteiro dos Santos Victoriano best known as Puna Victoriano, (born 19 February 1974) is a former Angolan basketball player. Puna, a 6'7" / 220lb Center born in Luanda, he played for Angola at the 1996 Summer Olympics and 1999 Afrobasket. On the club level, he played for Petro Atlético.

Puna is a younger brother of former Angola national basketball team members Ângelo Victoriano and Edmar Victoriano "Baduna".

References

External links
 
 1996 Summer Olympics Stats
 
 Basketball-Reference Profile
 RealGM Profile

1974 births
Living people
Angolan men's basketball players
Angolan expatriate basketball people in the United States
Basketball players at the 1996 Summer Olympics
Atlético Petróleos de Luanda basketball players
Western Nebraska Cougars men's basketball players
Olympic basketball players of Angola
Basketball players from Luanda
UTEP Miners men's basketball players
Centers (basketball)